Ronnell Anthony Lewis (born September 17, 1990) is a former American football outside linebacker. He played college football at the University of Oklahoma. He was drafted in the fourth round of the 2012 NFL Draft by the Lions.

High school career
Lewis attended Dewar High School in Dewar, Oklahoma, where he accounted for 2,219 yards on 150 rushes with 33 touchdowns in 2008 along with 156 tackles while he picked off 11 passes on defense and added 2,000 yards and 40 rushing touchdowns as a junior.

College career
Known for his big hits, Oklahoma Sooner fans have nicknamed Lewis "The Hammer".  He rose to national prominence after two big hits on special teams against Stanford in the 2009 Sun Bowl.  Lewis followed up a promising freshman season with a stellar sophomore campaign in 2010 in which he logged 3.5 sacks, 37 tackles, 5 tackles for loss, and a 12-yard interception return for a touchdown against the Baylor Bears despite only starting four games. In the 2012 NFL Combine, Ronnell ran the 40-yard dash in 4.68s and performed 36 repetitions of 225 lbs.

Professional career

2012 NFL Draft

Detroit Lions
In the 2012 NFL draft, Lewis was drafted with the 125th overall pick (30th pick of the 4th round) to the Detroit Lions.

On August 25, 2013, he was released by the Detroit Lions.

Toronto Argonauts
On September 10, 2013, Lewis was signed by the Toronto Argonauts of the Canadian Football League to a practice roster agreement. He was released by the Argonauts on October 2, 2013.

Oklahoma Defenders
On November 26, 2013, Lewis was signed by the Oklahoma Defenders of the Champions Professional Indoor Football League for the 2014 season.

Boston Brawlers
Lewis played for the Boston Brawlers of the Fall Experimental Football League in Fall 2014.

Spokane Shock
On December 3, 2014, Lewis was assigned to the Spokane Shock of the Arena Football League.

Los Angeles KISS
On March 14, 2015, Lewis was traded to the Los Angeles KISS in exchange for Rod Harper. He was placed on reassignment on May 19, 2015.

Spokane Empire
On September 11, 2015, Lewis signed with Spokane again, but this team with the new Spokane Empire of the Indoor Football League. He was released on January 13, 2016.

Personal life
Lewis is an enrolled member of the Muscogee (Creek) nation. On April 20, 2013, Lewis was arrested at 1:30 A.M. on three misdemeanor charges following a bar brawl at Norman, Oklahoma.

References

External links
Oklahoma Sooners bio
Rivals Recruiting profile

1990 births
Living people
People from Okmulgee County, Oklahoma
American football defensive ends
Under Armour All-American football players
Oklahoma Sooners football players
Detroit Lions players
Oklahoma Defenders players
Boston Brawlers players
Spokane Shock players
Los Angeles Kiss players